The Safety Investigation Authority (SIA) is an agency of the government of Iceland. It investigates maritime, traffic, and aviation accidents and incidents, as well as other serious incidents. It is headquartered in Reykjavík. The SIA reports to the Minister of the Interior.

It was established in 2013 when the board of investigations for aviation accidents, traffic accidents and maritime accidents was combined together into one institution.  It consists of 7 staff, 2 for each division along with one receptionist. It also has a board with 13 members that don't work full-time for the institution.

References

External links 
 Rannsóknarnefnd Samgönguslysa (Icelandic)

Government of Iceland
Aviation organizations based in Iceland
Organizations investigating aviation accidents and incidents